Adrián Melosi (born 10 December 1956) is an Argentine equestrian. He competed in the team jumping event at the 1984 Summer Olympics.

References

1956 births
Living people
Argentine male equestrians
Olympic equestrians of Argentina
Equestrians at the 1984 Summer Olympics
Place of birth missing (living people)